The Switch is the second studio album by the American experimental rock duo Body/Head. It was released on July 13, 2018, under Matador Records.

Critical reception
The Switch was met with "generally favorable" reviews from critics. At Metacritic, which assigns a weighted average rating out of 100 to reviews from mainstream publications, this release received an average score of 75, based on 17 reviews. Aggregator Album of the Year gave the release a 71 out of 100 based on a critical consensus of 17 reviews.

Accolades

Track listing

References

2018 albums
Body/Head albums
Matador Records albums